Odanavattam  is a village in Kollam district in the state of Kerala, India. The village is situated 22 km east from Kollam town and is under the administration of Veliyam panchayath.
Odanavattom is near to Edakkidom and Kottarakkara the birthplace of Kathakali.

Education
There is a Government Senior Secondary school in the town. There are also many private Upper Primary schools in Odanavattam. K.R.G.P.M School is situated here. Odanavattom is near to Edakkidom and Kottarakkara the birthplace of Kathakali

Industries

Quilon Rental is one of the growing construction equipment rental firm with its function started here in the year 2013. Their feet includes Bobcat E32 Excavator, Bobcat E37 Excavator, Skid Steer Loader, JCB 3DX, Hitachi EX 110 Excavator, Hitachi EX 70 Excavator, Komatsu PC 130 Excavator, Scaffolding, Concrete Machines, Power Tools etc. They also undertake Demolition activities.

Tourism 

Muttara Maruthimala ecotourism is located near Odanavattom. Iruppinkuttu waterfalls is also located near Odanavattom.

Demographics
 India census, Odanavattam had a population of 15419 with 7454 males and 7965 females.

Politics
Odanavattam is part of Mavelikara Lok Sabha constituency.

References

Villages in Kollam district